Las Ventanas is a Chilean city in Puchuncaví commune, Valparaíso Province, Valparaíso Region. Pop. 5,957 (2002 census).

Populated places in Valparaíso Province